Lincolnshire is an English ceremonial county consisting of the North Lincolnshire and North East Lincolnshire unitary authorities and the non-metropolitan Lincolnshire County Council, made up of six districts (Boston, East Lindsey, North Kesteven, South Holland, South Kesteven and West Lindsey) and the City of Lincoln. The non-metropolitan county is in the East Midlands, while the two unitary authorities are part of the Yorkshire and Humber region. Bound to the south by Rutland, Northamptonshire and Cambridgeshire, to the south-east by Norfolk and to the west by Leicestershire, Nottinghamshire and South Yorkshire, Lincolnshire's eastern edge follows the coastline with the North Sea and the southern bank of the River Humber to the north. The county's area is the fourth largest in England, but its population, at 714,800, is only the 14th highest.

Local nature reserves (LNRs) are designated by local authorities under the National Parks and Access to the Countryside Act 1949. The local authority must have legal control over the site, by owning or leasing it or having an agreement with the owner. LNRs are sites which have a special local interest either biologically or geologically, and local authorities have a duty to care for them. They can apply local bye-laws to manage and protect LNRs. As of January 2018, Lincolnshire has 32 designated Local Nature Reserves.

Sites

References 

Lincolnshire-related lists
Lincolnshire